Cléguer is a commune in the Morbihan department of Brittany in north-western France.

Demographics

Inhabitants of Cléguer are called in French Cléguerois.

Geography

The town lies in the valley of the river Scorff. The river Scorff forms the commune's western border. Historically, Cléguer belongs to Vannetais.

Map

See also
Communes of the Morbihan department

References

External links

Official site 

Mayors of Morbihan Association 

Communes of Morbihan